The New Haven Open was a golf tournament on the Nike Tour. It ran from 1990 to 1993. It was played at the Yale Golf Course in New Haven, Connecticut.

Winners

References 

Former Korn Ferry Tour events
Golf in Connecticut
Sports competitions in Connecticut
Sports in New Haven, Connecticut
Recurring sporting events established in 1990
Recurring sporting events disestablished in 1993
1990 establishments in Connecticut
1993 disestablishments in Connecticut